Wolfgang Matz (born 15 April 1944 – 22 November 1995) was a German football player. He spent two seasons in the Bundesliga with Eintracht Braunschweig.

Honours
 Bundesliga champion: 1966–67

References

External links
 

1944 births
1995 deaths
German footballers
People from Salzgitter
Footballers from Lower Saxony
Eintracht Braunschweig players
Fortuna Düsseldorf players
VfL Wolfsburg players
Bundesliga players
2. Bundesliga players
Association football defenders